Paul Greig is currently General Manager for Raith Rovers Community Foundation. He formerly held roles with the Scottish FA as Performance Hub Head Coach & Coach Education Tutor as well as Heart of Midlothian Women Assistant Manager. In 2016 and 2017 Greig was an Assistant Coach for Sky Blue FC in the National Women's Soccer League in the US. Greig has held roles in his native Scotland, New Zealand and the United States.

Early life
Greig graduated from Balwearie High School, Kirkcaldy in 2004 with 8 Standards Grades. He is qualified Coach Educator and children, youth and adult qualified football/soccer coach.

Honors and awards
Winner: ASB Women's League 2015, New Zealand; 
Youngest Head Coach to win a National League title in New Zealand at the age of just 28 years old.

References

 http://www.spartansfcwomen.com/interview-we-talk-to-new-spartans-swpl-head-coach-paul-greig/
 Sky Blue Assistant Coach Profile

1987 births
Living people
NJ/NY Gotham FC non-playing staff
Scottish football managers